Santiago High School is a high school located in Garden Grove, California, and is a member of the Garden Grove Unified School District. The school's athletic teams are known as the Cavaliers. Santiago High School has been an AVID National Demonstration School since 2007 and an AVID Schoolwide Site of Distinction since 2016.

Enrollment 
The total enrollment of Santiago High School was 2,121 students for the 2015–16 school year.

Notable alumni
 Bert Blyleven (class of 1969) – Major League pitcher; played on many teams from 1970 to 1992.
 Eddie Bravo- Brazilian Jiu Jitsu black belt Founder of 10th Planet Jiu Jitsu
 Brittany Ishibashi - Actress

Athletics

Weekend programs

References

External links
  - The school's official homepage
  - A PDF copy of the school's 2009-2010 report card.

High schools in Orange County, California
Education in Garden Grove, California
Public high schools in California